Christophe Mirgain (18 August 1902 – 1 March 1999) was a Luxembourgian sprinter. He competed in the men's 400 metres at the 1924 Summer Olympics.

References

External links
 

1902 births
1999 deaths
Athletes (track and field) at the 1924 Summer Olympics
Luxembourgian male sprinters
Luxembourgian male middle-distance runners
Olympic athletes of Luxembourg
Place of birth missing